Garett Wall (1750–1820) was an Irish Anglican priest.

Wall was educated at Trinity College, Dublin. He was the incumbent at Ballyroan from  1813 to 1818, and of Ardbraccan from then until 1823. In He held incumbencies at Templebredon and Pallasgreen. In 1772 he became Treasurer of Cashel; and in 1788 Archdeacon of Emly, a post he held until his death in November 1820.

References

Alumni of Trinity College Dublin
Archdeacons of Emly
18th-century Irish Anglican priests
19th-century Irish Anglican priests
1750 births
1820 deaths